Waterloo Airport may refer to:

 Region of Waterloo International Airport in Waterloo Region, Ontario, Canada (IATA: YKF)
 Waterloo Regional Airport in Waterloo, Iowa, United States (FAA: ALO)
 Walker/Rowe Waterloo Airport in Waterloo, Indiana, United States (FAA: 4C2)

See also
 Waterloo Air Terminal, in London, England 1953–1957